Jankidas Mehra (1910 – 18 June 2003) was an Indian actor of Hindi cinema, cyclist, production designer, and writer. He made over 1000 film appearances between the 1930s and 1997.

Biography

Sports
Jankidas served as the only Indian member of the International Olympic Committee at the 1936 Olympic Games in Berlin along with Hockey legend Major Dhyanchand  and was the only Indian to have broken the world record in cycling between 1934 and 1942.

In the 1940s, along with Sohrab Bhoot, he founded the Cycling Federation of India.

Films
Jankidas debuted in films playing a major role in Khazanchi (1941), produced in Lahore. He was not seen again until 1946, when he would appear in Dr. Kotnis Ki Amar Kahani. From then on he would continue to play roles with increasing vigour over the years.

As a production designer, Jankidas was responsible for the founding of many famous Indian actor's careers. He was responsible for Madhubala's role in Sohrab Modi's Daulat in 1947, and introduced Meena Kumari in Nanabhai Bhatt's Hamara Ghar, and Khushbu in Sunil Dutt's Dard Ka Rishta. He also introduced actress Mala Sinha in Hamlet, produced and directed by Kishore Sahu.

In 1985, he wrote the script for the film Yaadon Ki Kasam.

Jankidas was the recipient of numerous national and international awards. In May 1996, he was honored with the Lifetime Achievement Award given by the Indian Motion Pictures Producers' Association.

Jankidas was also an author and wrote numerous books on Bollywood and the acting profession. He published  My Misadventures in Filmland and Acting for Beginners.

Selected filmography

Death
Jankidas had had a heart ailment for a substantial period of time, but was discharged from the local hospital two days before his death. He died of cardiac failure at his Juhu residence on Wednesday 18 June 2003. He was 93.

References

External links and sources 
 

Indian male film actors
Indian production designers
1910 births
2003 deaths
Indian male cyclists